The arrondissement of Thionville is an arrondissement of France in the Moselle department in the Grand Est region. It has 104 communes.

Composition

The communes of the arrondissement of Thionville are:

Aboncourt
Algrange
Angevillers
Apach
Audun-le-Tiche
Aumetz
Basse-Ham
Basse-Rentgen
Berg-sur-Moselle
Bertrange
Bettelainville
Beyren-lès-Sierck
Boulange
Bousse
Boust
Breistroff-la-Grande
Buding
Budling
Cattenom
Clouange
Contz-les-Bains
Distroff
Elzange
Entrange
Escherange
Évrange
Fameck
Fixem
Flastroff
Florange
Fontoy
Gandrange
Gavisse
Grindorff-Bizing
Guénange
Hagen
Halstroff
Haute-Kontz
Havange
Hayange
Hettange-Grande
Hombourg-Budange
Hunting
Illange
Inglange
Kanfen
Kédange-sur-Canner
Kemplich
Kerling-lès-Sierck
Kirsch-lès-Sierck
Kirschnaumen
Klang
Knutange
Kœnigsmacker
Kuntzig
Laumesfeld
Launstroff
Lommerange
Luttange
Malling
Manderen-Ritzing
Manom
Merschweiller
Metzeresche
Metzervisse
Mondelange
Mondorff
Monneren
Montenach
Moyeuvre-Grande
Moyeuvre-Petite
Neufchef
Nilvange
Ottange
Oudrenne
Puttelange-lès-Thionville
Ranguevaux
Rédange
Rémeling
Rettel
Richemont
Rochonvillers
Rodemack
Rosselange
Roussy-le-Village
Rurange-lès-Thionville
Russange
Rustroff
Serémange-Erzange
Sierck-les-Bains
Stuckange
Terville
Thionville
Tressange
Yutz
Uckange
Valmestroff
Veckring
Vitry-sur-Orne
Volmerange-les-Mines
Volstroff
Waldweistroff
Waldwisse
Zoufftgen

History

The arrondissement of Thionville was created in 1800 and disbanded in 1871 (ceded to Germany). The arrondissement of Thionville was restored in January 2015 by the merger of the former arrondissements of Thionville-Est and Thionville-Ouest.

References

Thionville
States and territories established in 2015